Fullerton Health is an integrated enterprise healthcare service provider founded in 2011 in Singapore. The company specializes in designing customized medical services for corporate and insurer clients. Fullerton Health began with an initial investment in corporate healthcare providers Gethin-Jones and Drs Trythall Hoy Davies. Over the years, they grew through both organic growth and investments and mergers and acquisitions.

Fullerton Health made 3 major acquisitions in 2015 which helped grow its presence in both existing and new markets. In May, their subsidiary, Global Assistance & Healthcare (GAH) acquired PT JLT GESA, more commonly known as Medilum, that provides managed healthcare and third-party administration services. Later in August, they bought an 80 percent stake in Hong Kong medical provider, HMMP Limited (HMMP), for SGD$33 million. Above all, the purchase of Radlink-Asia in Singapore for SGD$111.2 million marked its entry into the advanced medical diagnostic imaging market and allowed it to cut costs through the digitisation of processes.

As of June 30, 2016, Fullerton Health owns 198 clinics and facilities across Singapore, Hong Kong, Indonesia, and Malaysia, has close to 2,000 employees and sees an annual revenue of more than S$300 million.

History

Founding 
Fullerton Health was co-founded in 2011 by its chief executive Dr. Michael Tan and deputy chief executive Dr. Daniel Chan through an initial investment in corporate healthcare providers Gethin-Jones and Drs Trythall Hoy Davies, which have been around since the 1950s, starting out with 10 clinics and 70 staff during that time.

Expansion and Regional Footprint 
From 2011 to 2016, the Singapore-based healthcare provider has expanded its presence to Malaysia, Indonesia, and Hong Kong and now operates with a staff of close to 400 medical professionals and over 1,000 support staff and a network of over 8,000 associate hospitals and clinics.

As of 2016, Fullerton Health receives an average of 4 million patient visits per annum and has served approximately 10 million people with its medical services, working with approximately 25,000 companies across Asia-Pacific to provide employers and employees with access to affordable healthcare services. Its corporate clientele include Marina Bay Sands, Standard Chartered Bank, Singapore Airlines and other multinational corporation employees, as well as SME employees.

Awards

Corporate Affairs 
Financial Performance

In 2014, Fullerton Health experienced more than double revenue growth to S$163.8 million followed by a 46.9% growth in 2015 to S$240.6 million.

Charitable Causes - Project Big Heart

Project Big Heart is a joint project by Fullerton Health, Jurong Central CCC and Loving Heart Multi-Service Centre (Jurong). The initiative was created to give lower-income residents and the elderly diagnosed with chronic conditions like high blood pressure and diabetes free medical services. It was first launched in January 2015 and was made available only to residents in Jurong Central. Recently, the programme was launched in Jurong Spring and Yuhua.

In February 2016, about 600 Jurong GRC in the Community Heath Assist Scheme (CHAS) participated in the Project Big Heart carnival, a joint project with Fullerton Health Group. Medication was prescribed to patients at no cost.

References 

Health care companies of Singapore
Singaporean brands